Bülent Ortaçgil (born 1 March 1950) is a Turkish composer and singer.

Biography
He was born in Ankara, Turkey in 1950. He moved to Istanbul after starting elementary school which he finished at Sultanahmet Elementary School in Istanbul. He completed his middle school and high school education at Kadıköy Anadolu Lisesi which is also commonly known as Kadıköy Maarif College. He graduated from the University of Istanbul, Faculty of Chemistry.

Musical career
He started playing guitar while at Kadıköy Maarif Koleji. Another popular composer and singer Mazhar Alanson (from the band MFÖ) was concurrently a student at the same school, and says that Ortaçgil was a guitar player that he admired back in school. He played with some groups, including Damlalar (Drops). His music has been influenced by various artists, including The Beatles, Cat Stevens, Donovan and Bob Dylan. His first long play was called "Anlamsız" (Meaningless), which he published while in college.

In 1974, his first album was released under the title "Benimle Oynar Mısın?" (Will You Play with Me?), considered to be a classic. Onno Tunç and Ergun Pekcan were among those who helped the recording and mastering of his albums.

He took a ten-year break from music after he got married. During this time, he worked as a chemical engineer at companies like Pfizer and Netaş Telecom. During 1985, Ortaçgil played with Fikret Kızılok at "Çekirdek Müzikevi"; this performance yielded to a non-published copy album "Bizim Şarkılarımız …".

The album "Pencere Önü Çiçeği" (Windowsill Flower) was published in 1986. The song Pencere Önü Çiçeği was another classic, criticizing an intellectual, isolated life against a life "outside the window."

In 1991 came the album called "Oyuna Devam" (Let the game continue). The album gathered some of his old band friends such as Erkan Oğur, Cem Aksel and Gürol Ağırbaş, who had been playing together for over 10 years.

In 2000, a tribute album called "Şarkılar bir Oyundur" (Songs Are a Game) was published, featuring performances from 22 different Turkish singers and bands, spanning a wide genre of music among them.

He frequently uses the theme "game"/"play" in his songs.

Discography

Singles 
 1971: Anlamsız / Yüzünü Dökme Küçük Kız
 1974: Olmalı mı, Olmamalı mı? / Şık Latife

Studio albums 
 1974: Benimle Oynar Mısın?
 1990: 2. Perde
 1991: Oyuna Devam
 1994: Bu Şarkılar Adam Olmaz
 1998: Light
 2003: Gece Yalanları
 2010: Sen
 2022: Elli Buçuk

Other albums 
 1976: 3 Masal (Masal album)
 1984: Rüzgara Söylenen Şarkılar (live album)
 1985: Biz Şarkılarımızı.. (recorded live with Fikret Kızılok)
 1986: Pencere Önü Çiçeği (with Fikret Kızılok)
 1999: Eski Defterler (Contains new versions of his earlier works)
 2007: Teoman-Bülent Ortaçgil Konser (live with Teoman)
 2007: Büyükler İçin Çocuk Şarkıları (recorded with Fikret Kızılok in 1987 and released 20 years later)
 2017: Senfonik Ortaçgil (Concert DVD)

Notes

External links
Bülent Ortaçgil on Facebook
Information on Bülent Ortaçgil

1950 births
Musicians from Ankara
Living people
Turkish singer-songwriters
Kadıköy Anadolu Lisesi alumni